Hồ Hán Thương (?–1407?) was the second and final emperor of the short-lived Hồ dynasty of Đại Ngu (now Viet Nam).

Hán Thương, his father Hồ Quý Ly, and his son Nhe, were captured by the Ming forces during the Ming–Hồ War in June 1407 and died in exile in China. Hồ Hán Thương was executed by Zhu Di during the Ming dynasty.

Notes
 The Hồ Dynasty (1400–1407) renamed the country Đại Ngu, with Tây Đô as the capital.

References

15th-century Vietnamese monarchs
Hồ dynasty emperors
Hồ dynasty
Vietnamese monarchs
Date of birth unknown
Date of death unknown
Place of birth unknown
People executed by the Ming dynasty